The Harris Theater is a landmark building at 809 Liberty Avenue in Downtown Pittsburgh, Pennsylvania's Cultural District. The 200-seat theater is owned and operated by the Pittsburgh Cultural Trust.

Built as Art Cinema, it was the first Pittsburgh venue to show only "art movies". In the 1960s, it featured pornographic films at a time when Liberty Avenue was a red-light district. The Pittsburgh Cultural Trust purchased and refurbished the theater as part of its plan for the Cultural District.

In 1995 it was renamed The Harris with a gift from the Buhl Foundation, in honor of John P. Harris, who was a co-founder of the Nickelodeon—the first theater solely dedicated to the showing of motion pictures—and a Pennsylvania State Senator. The name "Nickelodeon" was coined by Harry Davis and John P. Harris, who opened their small, storefront theatre under that name on Smithfield Street in Pittsburgh in June 1905. Davis and Harris found such great success that their concept of a five cent theatre running movies continuously was soon imitated by other entrepreneurs, as was the name of the theatre itself.

References

External links
Harris Theater homepage
Harris Theatre at Cinema Treasures

Theatres in Pittsburgh
Pittsburgh History & Landmarks Foundation Historic Landmarks
Theatres completed in 1931